Besharam is a 1978 Hindi drama/thriller film produced and directed by veteran character actor Deven Verma. The film stars Amitabh Bachchan, Sharmila Tagore, Amjad Khan, A. K. Hangal, Iftekhar, Nirupa Roy and Deven Verma. The film's music was composed by Kalyanji Anandji. The movie was not a hit on release and fared poorly.
An innocent man sets out to find the truth about his father's death. He finds himself in a dangerous battle with the criminal underworld.

Plot 
After Digvijay Singh (Amjad Khan) implicates him as a corrupt person, Ramchandra (A. K. Hangal), a teacher, commits suicide. After this incident, his obedient and simple son Ram Kumar (Amitabh Bachchan), an insurance agent, faces many difficulties. Resolved to fight against the injustice in society and uncover the criminal elements, he joins forces with the Police Commissioner (Iftekar) and transforms himself into Prince Chandrashekar, a top diamond businessman from South Africa.

A few years later, Digvijay Singh becomes a powerful person in the city with a dubious personality. He seems to be a decent industrialist, Dharamdas, while smuggling drugs, running many criminal activities and keeping poisonous snakes to kill his enemies and traitors.

Ram Kumar loves Rinku (Sharmila Tagore), unaware that she is Dharamdas's sister. Disguised as Prince Chandrashekar, Ram wins the heart of Dharmdas's beloved Manju (Bindu), who gets close to him and enters his business. Finally, he succeeds in arresting him.

Cast 
Amitabh Bachchan as Ram Kumar / Prince Chandrashekhar
Sharmila Tagore as Rinku / Monica
Bindu as Manju
Amjad Khan as Digvijay Singh / Dharamdas
Uma Dhawan – Chanda
Dhumal – Mukhiya
A. K. Hangal – Ramchandra
Nirupa Roy – Mrs. Ramchandra
Iftekhar – Police Commissioner
Imtiaz – Tony (as Imtiyaz)
Jagdish Raj – Pandey
Jayshree T. – Rosie
Deven Verma – Laxman, his father and mother
Urmila Bhatt – Rosy
Helen as an item dancer

Crew 
Director – Deven Verma
Producer – Deven Verma
Production Company – Navratna Films
Music Director – Kalyanji Anandji
Playback Singers – Asha Bhosle, Lata Mangeshkar, Mahendra Kapoor

Soundtrack

External links 
 
 

1978 films
1970s Hindi-language films
Films scored by Kalyanji Anandji
1970s thriller drama films
Indian thriller drama films
Films directed by Deven Verma
1978 drama films